Amie Nicole Harwick (May 20, 1981February 15, 2020) was an American writer and marriage and family therapist.

Biography  

Harwick was adopted as a child. She worked as a Playboy model and dance performer to pay for her postsecondary education. She studied psychology at California State Polytechnic University in Pomona, earned a Master of Arts degree from Pepperdine University in clinical psychology, a Ph.D. from the non-accredited Institute for Advanced Study of Human Sexuality, and later became a licensed marriage and family therapist. Harwick was a well-known therapist in West Hollywood, specializing in family and sex counseling. She regularly appeared on podcasts, TV, and her YouTube channel to discuss her work. She was the author of the book, The New Sex Bible for Women: The Complete Guide to Sexual Self-Awareness and Intimacy published in 2014.

At the time of her death, she had started working with Pineapple Support, an organization of sex-work-positive mental health professionals that had been founded in late 2017 in the wake of a rash of adult-industry suicides.

Personal life  

Harwick and comedian Drew Carey first met at a party in the summer of 2017. Carey posted a photo of them together on Instagram with the caption: "The face of a lottery winner (L)."  Within a year Carey proposed to her and they became engaged. The engagement was called off in 2018 and the split was reported as amicable. After her death, Carey told NBC that Harwick was "A positive force in the world and an unapologetic champion of women."

Death  

On February 15, 2020, Harwick was found under a balcony at her home and died after being taken to the hospital. The initial investigation found that she had been strangled and thrown from the third floor after a fight. The suspect, ex-boyfriend Gareth Pursehouse, against whom she had twice filed restraining orders, was arrested the next day and was charged for murder with the special circumstance of 'lying in wait', breaking and entering, and home burglary. He was released under a $2million bail bond, then re-arrested after pleading not guilty on April 16, 2020.

References 

1981 births
2020 deaths
American writers
Deaths from falls
American murder victims